Mainwan  is a village in Kapurthala district of Punjab State, India. The village is administrated by a Sarpanch, who is an elected representative.

Demography 
According to the report published by Census India in 2011, Mainwan has total number of 168 houses and population of 837 of which include 438 males and 399 females. Literacy rate of Mainwan is 75.90%, higher than state average of 75.84%.  The population of children under the age of 6 years is 90 which is 10.75% of total population of Mainwan, and child sex ratio is approximately  1045, higher than state average of 846.

Population data

Air travel connectivity 
The closest airport to the village is Sri Guru Ram Dass Jee International Airport.

Villages in Kapurthala

References

External links
  Villages in Kapurthala
 Kapurthala Villages List

Villages in Kapurthala district